The 1965 Irish general election to the 18th Dáil was held on Wednesday, 7 April, following the dissolution of the 17th Dáil on 18 March by President Éamon de Valera on the request of Taoiseach Seán Lemass. The general election took place in 38 Dáil constituencies throughout Ireland for 144 seats in Dáil Éireann, the house of representatives of the Oireachtas. The governing Fianna Fáil saw a slight increase, though did not obtain a majority.

The 18th Dáil met at Leinster House on 21 April to nominate the Taoiseach for appointment by the president and to approve the appointment of a new government of Ireland. Lemass was re-appointed Taoiseach, forming the 11th Government of Ireland, a single-party minority Fianna Fáil government.

Campaign
The general election of 1965 was caused by the ruling Fianna Fáil party's failure to gain a seat in a by-election. The success of Eileen Desmond of the Labour Party in Cork Mid in holding a seat previously held by her husband Dan Desmond, led to an unacceptable mathematical situation with regard to the government's majority. The Taoiseach, Seán Lemass immediately dissolved the Dáil and the campaign began in earnest.

Fianna Fáil ran its campaign on its record in government. Over the last number of years the economy had seen a huge improvement and the party played up on its record in government. The party also played up heavily on the personality of the party leader with the slogan "Let Lemass Lead On". Fine Gael put forward a comprehensive manifesto, which included the establishment of a government department concerned with economic planning.  However, the older, conservative members of the party did not warm to the new turn the party was taking.

Television and radio
This was the first Irish general election to be covered on television by state broadcaster RTÉ, which had formed on 31 December 1961. Election Newsroom was broadcast live on Telefís Éireann from their Donnybrook studios in Dublin, presented by John O'Donoghue with analysis provided by John Healy (The Irish Times), John O'Sullivan (The Cork Examiner), Garret FitzGerald and Professor Basil Chubb. Cameras were present in four count centres: Bolton Street (Dublin), Wexford, Cork and Monaghan. The GPO provided direct links as results were announced. Raidió Éireann provided special coverage from 3 pm on the day of the count due to the coverage on Telefís Éireann. It was a new approach to election coverage on the state's radio service, which began broadcasting in 1926.

Result

|}

Voting summary

Seats summary

Government formation and aftermath
Fianna Fáil formed the 11th Government of Ireland, a single-party government led by Seán Lemass as Taoiseach. Lemass had been in office since 1959.

James Dillon resigned as leader of Fine Gael immediately after the result was announced.

In November 1966, Lemass resigned as Fianna Fáil leader and Taoiseach, and was succeeded in both positions by Jack Lynch, who formed the 12th Government of Ireland.

Changes in membership

First time TDs
David Andrews
Luke Belton
Ben Briscoe
Flor Crowley
Tom Fitzpatrick (Cavan)
Tom Fitzpatrick (Dublin)
James Kennedy
Patrick Lenihan
Gerry L'Estrange
Michael Lyons
Bobby Molloy
John O'Connell
Michael O'Leary
Pearse Wyse

Re-elected TDs
Gus Healy
Denis Larkin

Outgoing TDs
Gerald Bartley (Retired)
Seán Brady (Lost seat)
Robert Briscoe (Retired)
Dan Breen (Retired)
Joseph Blowick (Retired)
John Moher (Lost seat)
Denis J. O'Sullivan (Lost seat)
James Ryan (Retired)
Eugene Timmons (Lost seat)

See also
Members of the 11th Seanad

Notes

References

1965 elections in Europe
General election, 1965
1965 in Irish politics
1965
18th Dáil
April 1965 events in Europe